The history of local government in Wales in a recognisably modern form emerged during the late 19th century. Administrative counties and county boroughs were first established in Wales in 1889. Urban and rural districts were formed in 1894. These were replaced in 1974 by a two-tier authority system across the country comprising eight counties and, within them, thirty-seven districts. This system was itself replaced by the introduction of 22 single-tier authorities in 1996.

Local Government Act 1888
From 1889 to 1974, counties made up of administrative counties and county boroughs were used for local government purposes. The counties were created by the Local Government Act 1888 (51 & 52 Vict, c. 41), which applied without distinction across Wales and England, and in Wales the administrative counties were based on the historic counties of Wales, but they were not entirely identical.

The 1888 Act did not create elected district councils, but anticipated their later creation, which came with the Local Government Act 1894. The 1894 Act created 'urban districts' and 'rural districts'.

Administrative counties

The table shows the area and population of administrative counties in Wales as recorded at the censuses of 1891 and 1961.

(1)Renamed from Carnarvonshire, 1 July 1926

County boroughs
There were also a number of administratively independent county boroughs:
Cardiff created in 1889 (associated with Glamorgan)
Swansea, created in 1889 (associated with Glamorgan)
Newport, separated from Monmouthshire in 1891
Merthyr Tydfil, separated from Glamorgan in 1908

Local Government Act 1972: Counties and districts

In 1974, the existing administrative counties and county boroughs were abolished and replaced by eight new two-tier authorities, instead called 'counties' by the Local Government Act 1972 (1972 c. 70). These counties were sub-divided into lower-tier districts.

The counties were all given names in Welsh only, apart from the three in Glamorgan, which had English names as well as Welsh.  The creation of these new administrative areas effectively separated the administrative function from the traditional counties, although in reality this had occurred in 1889.

When these two-tier counties were abolished in 1996, their names and areas were retained with slight modifications for some purposes such as Lieutenancy, and became known as the preserved counties of Wales.  These were further amended in 2003 by S.I. 2003/974 to ensure that each unitary area is wholly within one preserved county.

Counties
Gwent
South Glamorgan (De Morgannwg)
Mid Glamorgan (Morgannwg Ganol)
West Glamorgan (Gorllewin Morgannwg)
Dyfed
Powys
Gwynedd
Clwyd

Districts

The counties were sub-divided into districts, these were:

Clwyd — Alyn and Deeside, Colwyn, Delyn, Glyndwr, Rhuddlan, Wrexham Maelor
Dyfed — Carmarthen, Ceredigion, Dinefwr, Llanelli, Preseli Pembrokeshire (named Preseli until 1987), South Pembrokeshire
Gwent — Blaenau Gwent, Islwyn, Monmouth, Newport, Torfaen
Gwynedd — Aberconwy, Arfon, Dwyfor, Meirionnydd, Anglesey
Mid Glamorgan — Cynon Valley, Ogwr, Merthyr Tydfil, Rhondda, Rhymney Valley, Taff–Ely
Powys — Brecknock, Montgomery, Radnor
South Glamorgan — Cardiff, Vale of Glamorgan
West Glamorgan — Lliw Valley, Neath, Port Talbot (named Afan until 1986), Swansea

1996
The redistribution of these districts into the current unitary authorities is as follows:

See also

Local government in Wales
History of local government in the United Kingdom

References